Hussam Abu Saleh (born 9 May 1982) is a retired Israeli-Palestinian footballer who played as a full back and winger.

Club career
Husam Abu Saleh is one of many Arab Israeli footballers playing their trade in the West Bank Premier League. Abu Saleh started his professional career with his hometown club Bnei Sakhnin F.C. He was part of a generation of players coached by Azmi Nassar that secured promotion to the Israeli Premier League, won the Israel State Cup, and participated in the qualifying rounds of the UEFA Cup.

Abu Saleh left Bnei Sakhnin in 2006 to join up with Nassar at Maccabi Kafr Kanna F.C., he scored 7 goals before moving the following season to Maccabi Ironi Tamra F.C. where he played alongside future Hilal Al-Quds teammate Haitham Dheeb. He joined Hilal Al-Quds in 2009 and was part of the side that won the 2011–12 Palestine Cup.

International career
He received his first call up to the Palestine in 2010 against Sudan. He has since played for Palestine at the 2010 WAFF Championship, 2012 AFC Challenge Cup qualification, 2014 FIFA World Cup qualifying and the 2015 AFC Asian Cup.

International goals
Scores and results list the Palestine's goal tally first.

Honours

National team
AFC Challenge Cup: 2014

References

External links

1982 births
Living people
Palestinian footballers
Palestine international footballers
Arab citizens of Israel
Bnei Sakhnin F.C. players
Maccabi Kafr Kanna F.C. players
Maccabi Ironi Tamra F.C. players
Hilal Al-Quds Club players
Ihud Bnei Majd al-Krum F.C. players
Hapoel Iksal F.C. players
Liga Leumit players
Israeli Premier League players
Footballers from Sakhnin
People from Sakhnin
2015 AFC Asian Cup players
Association football wingers
Association football fullbacks